In enzymology, a propionyl-CoA C2-trimethyltridecanoyltransferase is an enzyme that catalyzes the chemical reaction

4,8,12-trimethyltridecanoyl-CoA + propanoyl-CoA  3-oxopristanoyl-CoA + CoA

Thus, the two substrates of this enzyme are 4,8,12-trimethyltridecanoyl-CoA and propanoyl-CoA, whereas its two products are 3-oxopristanoyl-CoA and CoA.

This enzyme belongs to the family of transferases, specifically those acyltransferases transferring groups other than aminoacyl groups.  The systematic name of this enzyme class is 4,8,12-trimethyltridecanoyl-CoA:propanoyl-CoA C2-4,8,12-trimethyltridecanoyltransferase. Other names in common use include 3-oxopristanoyl-CoA hydrolase, 3-oxopristanoyl-CoA thiolase, peroxisome sterol carrier protein thiolase, sterol carrier protein, oxopristanoyl-CoA thiolase, peroxisomal 3-oxoacyl coenzyme A thiolase, SCPx, 4,8,12-trimethyltridecanoyl-CoA:propanoyl-CoA, and 2-C-4,8,12-trimethyltridecanoyltransferase.

References

 
 

EC 2.3.1
Enzymes of unknown structure